A Gadhi is a small castle-like structure or small fort, also known as a big wada.

Gadhi played an important role in Indian history. In some of the Princely States, during the Raj, the Gadhi were the residences for the local Royalty.

Gadhis were used as a focal point for the governance of a region, and as such were generally in the centre of the region.

See also
 Fort
 Castle

External links
 Chatrapati Shivaji Maharaja's Forts 
 History of Dahod (includes details of the Gadhi converted from a Dharma Shala)

References

Buildings and structures in Maharashtra